Ichon (National Museum of Korea) Station is a station in Yongsan-gu, Seoul on Seoul Subway Line 4 and Gyeongui–Jungang Line. This station is the closest to the National Museum of Korea, situated in the interior of Yongsan Family Park. It also serves eastern Ichon-dong, home to the largest Japanese community in South Korea with some 1,300 Japanese residents.

The Line 4 station is located in Yongsan-dong 5-ga and the Jungang Line station is located in Ichon-dong.

In 2018 it will become a transfer station with the Shinbundang Line.

Entrance
 Exit 1: Ward hall of Yongsan-gu
 Exit 2: Yongsan Family Park, Seobinggo-dong, National Museum of Korea - In case of overcrowding, use exit 1 instead
 Exit 3: Dongjak Bridge
 Exit 3-1: Ichon 1-dong, Sinyongsan Elementary School
 Exit 4: Townoffice of Ichon 1 dong, Jungkyung High School, Police office concerning Ichon 1-dong
 Exit 5: Yongsan tax office

References

External links
 Station information from Korail

Seoul Metropolitan Subway stations
Metro stations in Yongsan District
Railway stations opened in 1978